Riverside Township is one of 29 townships in Cook County, Illinois, USA.  As of the 2010 census, its population was 15,594.

Geography

Cities, towns, villages
 Brookfield (northeast quarter)
 Lyons (far northeastern edge)
 North Riverside (east three-quarters)
 Riverside (vast majority)

Unincorporated Town
 Riverside Lawn at 
 East Grossdale at

Adjacent townships
 Berwyn Township (east)
 Stickney Township (southeast)
 Lyons Township (southwest)
 Proviso Township (northwest)

Major highways
  U.S. Route 34

Rivers
 Des Plaines River

Landmarks
 Brookfield Zoo

These Cook County Forest Preserves Woods

 Brookfield Woods (Eastern majority)
 McCormick Woods
 Zoo Woods

Demographics

Political districts
 Illinois's 3rd congressional district
 State House District 08
 State House District 21
 State House District 41
 State Senate District 04
 State Senate District 11
 State Senate District 21

References
 
 United States Census Bureau 2007 TIGER/Line Shapefiles
 United States National Atlas

External links
 City-Data.com
 Illinois State Archives
 Cook County official site
 Riverside Township official website

Townships in Cook County, Illinois
Townships in Illinois